Musokios or Mužok was a 6th-century (Antes) monarch that ruled around 592, during Maurice's Balkan campaigns.

Menander Protector writes about Musokios in his works.

Raid on Ardagast
Ardagast, a commander of Musokios, was sent and raided Thrace, which prompted Emperor Maurice to deal with the Antae - sending an army with commander-in-chief Priscus and infantry commander Gentzon to cross the Danube at Dorostolon (present-day Silistra) and surprise attack the Slavs in their own territory (as the Slavs had long been pillaging the Byzantine Empire). The Army arrived at the Antae camp at midnight, surprising the Slavs who fled in confusion, Ardagast fell on a tree stump and was almost captured, but luckily he was near a river and eluded the caption.

Priscus sent his lieutenant Alexander across the Helibakion (Ialomiţa River) to find Slavs who were hiding in the woods and swamps, they failed to burn out the people hiding, but a Gepid Christian who was associated with the Slavs deserted and showed a secret passage after which the army easily captured the Slavs, who according to the Gepid, were spies sent by King Musokios that just heard about the attack on Ardagast.

End
When lieutenant Alexander returned with the Gepid and captives, the Gepid received handsome presents and arranged a strategy to bring Musokios and his army into the hands of the Byzantines.

The Gepid contacted Musokios and asked him to send a transport across the Paspirion river for the remaining army of Ardagast, Musokios assembled 150 monoxyles and 30 oarsmen which crossed the river. Meanwhile, Priscus approached the banks and met with the Gepid and arranged an ambush with 200 men in the guidance of Alexander.

On the following night, the boatmen were heavily intoxicated of wine and fell asleep. The Gepid gave the signal and the Slav colony was slaughtered, with the boats taken into Byzantine possession and filled with 300 soldiers heading towards Musukios.

A funeral ceremony of the brother of Musukios took place at the camp, with the people, as the boatsmen, being heavily intoxicated. Musukios was surprised and taken alive, a massacre lasted til the morning. Some Slavs escaped and returned to kill some of the army, as a result, Priscus hanged the negligent guards.

References

Sources
J B Bury, History of the Later Roman Empire from Arcadius to Irene, Vol 2, p. 129, 130 and 172

South Slavic history
6th-century rulers in Europe
6th-century Slavs
Slavic warriors